Soup is the second studio album by American rock band Blind Melon, released on August 15, 1995. The album was released eight weeks before vocalist Shannon Hoon's fatal drug overdose, making it his final album with the band, though it was not their last release with him, as his posthumously released work was included on the next album Nico. It reached number 28 on the US Billboard 200 albums chart.

Background
Thematically, the album is much darker than the band's debut. "2 X 4" is about Hoon's experience at a drug detox, while the lyrics to the acoustic ballad "Walk" cryptically reference his addiction and attempts to recovery. "Skinned" is about murderer Ed Gein. "Car Seat (God's Presents)" is about Susan Smith, who killed her children by driving her car into a lake in Union, South Carolina. "St. Andrew's Fall" is about suicide. When asked about "Mouthful of Cavities", Rogers Stevens said, "It's probably about the convoluted nooks and crannies of Shannon's brain." It featured harmonies between Hoon and Jena Kraus. "New Life" is about the birth of Hoon's daughter Nico Blue. "Wilt" is about halitosis. "Galaxie" is about Hoon's struggle with addiction, and experience with his car, a 1964 Ford Galaxie. "Lemonade" is a humorous song about a bar fight.

In a 2015 interview with the Songfacts website, Christopher Thorn explained how purchasing a variety of instruments led to the writing of certain songs on the album. "While writing songs for the Soup record, I was buying different instruments, and doing some songwriting experiments with them. I bought a banjo, so I wrote 'Skinned' just for fun. I never imagined Shannon would choose to write lyrics over that music. It was odd and really just so I could learn how to play banjo."

In a 2013 interview with Songfacts, Brad Smith recalled, "But Shannon, I think, meant every word that he said on the Soup record, and that's why it's maybe even more critically acclaimed than our first record. Our first record sold many, many more units than our second record, but the second record had a lot more critical acclaim to it. People recognize it as the truth and pure. And I think that's the earmark of a great record."

Album cover
The producer of the album, Andy Wallace, is seen on the cover, sipping soup. The letters in the soup spell out Blind Melon.

Critical reception

In issue 557 of Kerrang! (dated August 5, 1995), Paul Rees gave the album a "4 K review" (which means "Klassik"), saying, "Soup - bold, barmy, and borderline great."

In the August 21, 1995, issue of People, Andrew Abrahams gave the album a somewhat positive review, saying, "If Blind Melon's eclectic approach sounds a bit maddening, it can be. But at least they've accomplished an important task: establishing a musical life beyond the Bee Girl."

In issue 716 of Rolling Stone (dated September 7, 1995), Ted Drozdowski gave a scathing review of the album, ending his write-up with the statement, "With such slight fare to offer – and no kid in a bee suit – Soup puts Blind Melon in hot water."

Also in 1995, Soup was ranked number 13 in Kerrang! magazine's "Albums of the Year" list, above releases by the likes of Alice in Chains, Faith No More, Green Day, Ozzy Osbourne, and AC/DC.

Chart-wise, Soup fared best in Canada, where it held the #14 spot on the RPM Weekly chart for the weeks of September 18 & 25, 1995.

Soup was nominated for "Best Recording Package - Boxed" at the 38th Annual Grammy Awards.

Legacy
In 2005, Soup was ranked number 357 in Rock Hard magazine's book The 500 Greatest Rock & Metal Albums of All Time.

In the 2009 book, A Devil on One Shoulder and an Angel on the Other: The Story of Shannon Hoon and Blind Melon, drummer Glen Graham is quoted as saying, "I talked to a guy from Spain yesterday [from Popular 1 Magazine], and he was saying, "Soup is the top album of the '90s according to our readers.' It was like, 'What?'"

In 2014, Soup came in at the #1 on the "Top 10 Underrated 90’s Alternative Rock Albums" list for the Alternative Nation site.

The album took the number five spot on a "Top 10 Most Overlooked and Underrated Albums of the 90s" on the V+C website and was placed number 43 on the "50 Best Alternative Albums of the '90s" list on the MetroWeekly site.

On January 17, 2017, Soup was reissued on limited edition vinyl via Analog Sparks (cut from the original stereo tapes and pressed on 180-gram vinyl).

In an interview with the Long Island Pulse website in 2018, Thorn discussed why he feels the album has developed a cult following over the years. "It's crazy. Twenty years later, I feel finally validated. We felt like it was such a great record when it originally came out. For it to be slammed so hard, a record we were so proud of, was confusing to us. It was like, 'What? I thought we did a good job.' I get that it was dark and it was different than the first record, but in the end, it really grew on people. And more importantly, it has a great shelf life because people are not over it. I’m really flattered that people still care about that record."

In 2020, the Grammy site posted an article entitled How Blind Melon Lost Their Minds & Made A Masterpiece: 'Soup' Turns 25, that stated "Soup has quietly become a dark-horse favorite of the alt-rock era among fans and critics."

Planned live performance
In the aforementioned interview with Songfacts in 2015, Thorn spoke about plans for the band to perform the Soup album in its entirety, for the first time ever. "To celebrate the 20-year anniversary of the Soup record, Blind Melon is making plans to go play shows and perform the Soup record from top to bottom. We have never done that before, but we are excited to challenge ourselves. Some of the songs from the Soup record have never been performed live before." These performances of the entire album have never taken place.

Track listing

In addition to containing the hidden track "Hello, Goodbye", there is an additional hidden track in the pregap of the CD. To hear this track, listeners must stick the CD in their player, and as soon as track one begins, rewind the track to go into the negative pregap of a CD contained before index 01 in the CD's table of contents. In addition to being in the pregap, the vocals are also backmasked, while the instruments are normal. This track acts as an overture, containing elements of the song "New Life".

Personnel
Adapted credits from the liner notes of Soup.

Blind Melon
Shannon Hoon – vocals, guitar, harmonica, kazoo
Brad Smith – bass guitar, double bass, flute
Christopher Thorn – rhythm guitar, mandolin, banjo
Rogers Stevens – lead guitar, piano, Hammond organ
Glen Graham – drums, percussion

Additional musicians
Jena Kraus – backing vocals on "Mouthful of Cavities"
Miles Tackett – cello on "Car Seat" and "St. Andrew's Fall"

Production
Steve Sisco – mixing assistant
Andy Wallace – producer, engineer

Charts

Album

Singles

Certifications

References

Blind Melon albums
1995 albums
Albums produced by Andy Wallace (producer)
Capitol Records albums